Josefa de Tudó y Catalán, 1st Countess of Castillo Fiel, (in full), also known as Pepita Tudó (19 May 1779 - 20 September 1869) was the mistress of Spanish Prime Minister Manuel de Godoy. It has been suggested she was the model for two paintings by Goya, La maja desnuda (The Naked Maja) and La maja vestida (The Clothed Maja).

Biography
Tudó was born in Cádiz and she was always called "Pepita", a diminutive of Josefa. Her father was a gunner named Antonio de Tudó y Alemany who died when she was young. Since the age of sixteen, Pepita and her mother, Catalina Catalán y Luesia, and her sisters, Magdalena and Socorro, lived in the house of Manuel de Godoy, one of the most powerful men in Spain. Pepita was his lover by 1800.

However, the Queen of Spain, María Luisa, forced Godoy to marry María Teresa de Borbón y Vallabriga, Countess of Chinchón, a marriage which was favorable to Godoy for social reasons. The marriage did not end Godoy's relationship with Pepita; in 1805, she gave birth to a son, Manuel, and in 1807, she gave birth to another son, Luis.

In 1807, under Godoy's influence, Carlos IV presented Pepita with the title of Countess of Castillo Fiel and Viscountess of Rocafuerte. When María Teresa died in November 1828, Godoy and Pepita could finally marry, even though they had secretly performed a marriage ceremony years earlier. The following year or still in December 1828, Godoy and Pepita married. The Pope made him 1st Principe di Paserano; however, they moved to Paris in 1832 where they lived in somewhat straitened circumstances. Godoy was later given a pension by Louis Philippe I.

Later, Pepita returned to Spain in hopes of reclaiming the family properties. At ninety years old, Pepita told a reporter that Godoy knew only one true love: Queen María Luisa. She died in 1869 in Madrid.

In popular culture
Pepita is considered by many historians to be the model for one of Francisco de Goya's most notorious works, La maja desnuda.

The writer Ceferino Palencia wrote a play called Pepita Tudó, obviously inspired by Pepita herself and cast his half-Scottish wife Isabel Oyarzábal Smith in the titular role in the 1930s. 

Pepita Tudó was portrayed by Penélope Cruz in the 1999 film Volavérunt.

Gallery

References

1779 births
1869 deaths
Spanish countesses
Josefa 01
Josefa 01
People from Cádiz
Spanish artists' models
Mistresses
18th-century Spanish women
19th-century Spanish women